Richard O'Donoghue (1920-2002) was an actor, theatrical entrepreneur and poet. O'Donoghue was appointed Registrar for the Royal Academy of Dramatic Art, a position responsible for the student intake, support, and educational experience in their time at the college.

Early stage career 
Born on September 13, 1920, in Epsom, Surrey, Richard O'Donoghue went on to study at the Guildhall School of Music and Drama, later joining the repertory company at the New Theatre Hull. Alan Chadwick recalls the time in 1940 on stage with O'Donoghue playing with the Hull repertory company, "with German bombs falling nightly all around them".

During the war he was commissioned into the Royal Indian Army Service Corps, at the time one of the youngest majors.

Following demobilisation, he worked in repertory theatre with Peter Elliston and Aurora Productions Limited and later with Harry Hanson's Court Players at the Westcliff Palace.

Theatrical entrepreneur 
In 1961 he formed a managerial partnership with Gervase Farjeon (Director of the Players' Theatre 7/12/1953 and original commissioner of the musical The Boy Friend) to produce and present plays, the first of which was The Doctor and the Devils by Dylan Thomas at the Edinburgh Festival, following at the Empire Sunderland, and then acquiring the rights for presentation in the West End.

Productions included:

 Savagery and Delights at the Duchess Theatre, April 4 1963
 Domino, Marcel Archad's comedy adapted by Adrian Brine, toured the Royal Brighton, Lyric Hammersmith, Royal Court Liverpool, and the Royal Newcastle; May 2 1963
 New Clothes for the Emperor by Nicholas Stuart Gray at "The Royal" Stratford E15, Nov 28 1963
 Kindly Monkeys, the first play of Milton Hood Ward, presented at the Arts Theatre (then New Arts), April 1 1965
 An Evening of Music Hall with Cyril Fletcher, Jessie Matthews and members of the Players' Theatre at the Chichester Festival Theatre, April 29 1965
 Every Other Evening, a comedy adapted from the French play Des Enfants des Coeurs by Jack Popplewell, commissioned by O'Donoghue and Farjeon. The play toured the UK, opening at the Oxford New Theatre before ending in London's West End. Margaret Lockwood starred in the production, with her daughter Julia Lockwood also in the cast.

By 1968, O'Donoghue was working with the newly founded "Forum Theatre", Billingham, presenting plays in the West End under the guise of "Thespis Productions Limited"; The Imaginary Invalid, at the Vaudeville Theatre in April 1968, and Carry On Moliere, May 1968 (a revival of Molière's play in an English translation by John Wood).

Poetry 
Richard O'Donoghue was a lover of poetry and an accomplished poet himself, publishing two anthologies of poems, "Poems for a Princess", and "Verses on the Way to the Pub".

Richard O'Donoghue devised, presented and acted in the production of Dear Mr Kenyon at the Leeds Institute Gallery; a staged reading of the letters between Robert Browning and Elizabeth Barrett covering the time between their meeting, elopement and marriage. O'Donoghue played Robert Browning with his future wife, actress Anne King, as Elizabeth Barrett; October 1969.

His poem "Kensington Gardens" was published in the journal English: Journal of the English Association: OUP.

The Royal Academy of Dramatic Art 
With an excellent skill set from his extensive experience in the theatre, in 1967 Richard O'Donoghue was appointed to the senior management team of the Royal Academy of Dramatic Art as Registrar-Administrator and Secretary of the Vanbrugh Theatre Club, with responsibility for Vanbrugh Theatre productions, RADA's main theatre. As Registrar, O'Donoghue's role did not end with the assessment of suitability of applicants for studentship but afterwards would "inspire" students to fulfill their potential. In 1971, actor Doyle Richmond noted that he was accepted into RADA after "auditioning for Richard O'Donoghue", and was "the first Black and one of the youngest student-actors to be accepted into the internationally famous academy."

Under O'Donoghue's management, The Vanbrugh produced a wide range of plays which were chosen on the basis of giving experience to the students rather than their popularity with the audience. Nonetheless, the theatre drew the public and ran at a profit. The 1981 autumn season's diverse programme featured Euripides' Hippolytus, Shakespeare's Hamlet, Webster's The White Devil, plays from Ibsen, Strindberg and Feydeau, an adaption of Gorki, Stoppard's Travesties, and an improvised play directed by Andrew Neil.

Richard O'Donoghue remained at RADA till his retirement; about 20 years.

Obituary 
Richard O'Donoghue died on January 4, 2002; obituary, The Stage, 07/02/2002.

References 

1920 births
Theatre companies in the United Kingdom
People associated with RADA
Drama schools
2002 deaths
20th-century English male actors
English male stage actors
RADA
Indian Army personnel of World War II
British Indian Army officers